Imphal Railway station is an under-construction railway station in Imphal in Manipur, India.

Facilities 

The station will have two side-platforms.

Jiribam–Imphal line

Jiribam–Imphal line is a 111 km long railway line project costing ₹ 13,809 crore. It includes 8 new stations, 62 km of tunnels, 11 major bridges, 134 minor bridges, 4 road overbridges and 12 road underbridges. The Jiribam–Vangaichungpao–Tupul-Imphal route will connect Imphal, the capital of Manipur to the rest of India by a rail link. This line has India's longest tunnel, called tunnel no. 12, which has length of 11.55 km between Jiribam and Imphal West districts will surpass the 8.5 km Pir Panjal Railway Tunnel on the Banihal-Qazigund line as India's longest tunnel. There is a parallel 9.35 km long safety tunnel, compliant with the international technical specifications, with cross passages at every 500 metres for evacuation. Bridge no. 64 can be stated as a separate project as its total cost is ₹ 283.5 crore. The main tunnel and the parallel safety tunnels will cost ₹ 930 crore and ₹ 368 crore respectively. The project is expected to be fully completed by December 2023.

Imphal–Moreh–Kalay line: The Jiribam–Imphal line will be extended to Moreh on the India–Myanmar border. Under the Look East Policy of India, the line will be extended from Moreh to the existing railway line of Myanmar Railway Network at Kalay (also called Kale and Kalemyo) to form part of the ambitious Trans-Asian Railway.

See also

 Northeast Frontier Railway zone

References

Railway stations in Imphal East district
Lumding railway division
Proposed railway stations in India